The 1968 Maryland Terrapins men's soccer team represented the University of Maryland, College Park during the 1968 NCAA soccer season. It was the program's 23rd season of existence and their 20th season in the Atlantic Coast Conference.

The 1968 season was the first season where the Maryland Terrapins men's soccer program claimed an NCAA Division I Men's Soccer Championship, earning co-champion honors with Michigan State. The Terrapins were led by freshman Rocco Morelli, who scored a season-record 20 goals for the Terrapins. Since the 2017 season, it is the most goals in a college soccer season an individual has posted. Morelli also led the team with 46 total points, which remained the most points per individual in a season until Jason Garey broke the record in 2004. Midfielder, Larry Ruhs led Maryland in assists on the season, tallying seven total assists.

At the time, it was the Terps third ever season where they finished undefeated, and their first since 1958. To date, it is the most recent season where Maryland finished a season undefeated.

Roster

Schedule 

|-
!colspan=6 style=""| Regular season
|-

|-
!colspan=6 style=""| NCAA Tournament
|-

|}

Statistics

Points leaders 
Two points per goal, and one point per assist.

References 

Maryland Terrapins men's soccer seasons
Maryland
1968 in sports in Maryland
NCAA Division I Men's Soccer Tournament College Cup seasons
NCAA Division I Men's Soccer Tournament-winning seasons
Maryland
Maryland
1968